Rolando Villalobos Chacón (born 25 July 1953) is a retired Costa Rican footballer and football manager.

Club career
After coming through their youth ranks, Villalobos made his senior debut for Alajuelense on 9 May 1971 against rivals Saprissa and he scored his first goal on 12 April 1972 against Ramonense. He had a stint in Guatemala as well and also played for San Carlos and Saprissa.

He retired at Saprissa in 1988, his last game was on 12 May that year against his first club Alajuelense.

International career
He made his debut for Costa Rica in an August 1972 friendly match against Mexico and collected a total of 9 caps, scoring 1 goal. Villalobos played for Costa Rica at the 1975 Pan American Games.

International goals
Scores and results list Costa Rica's goal tally first.

Managerial career
Nicknamed el Cadáver, Villalobos has managed the Big Four clubs of Costa Rica as well as the national team on two occasions. He was assistant to Bora Milutinović at the 1990 FIFA World Cup.

He was named sports director of Cartaginés in May 2012 and in January 2014 he resigned as sports director of Puntarenas. Now he works for Club Sport Herediano as a sports manager.

Personal life
His son Walter Villalobos also is a professional football player. Married twice, Villalobos has 5 children.

References

External links
 Trayectoria de Rolando Villalobos como jugador y técnico (Biography) - Nación 

1953 births
Living people
Footballers from San José, Costa Rica
Association football midfielders
Costa Rican footballers
Costa Rica international footballers
Pan American Games competitors for Costa Rica
Footballers at the 1975 Pan American Games
L.D. Alajuelense footballers
Liga FPD players
A.D. San Carlos footballers
Deportivo Saprissa players
Costa Rican expatriate footballers
Expatriate footballers in Guatemala
Costa Rican expatriate sportspeople in Guatemala
Costa Rican football managers
Costa Rica national football team managers
Deportivo Saprissa managers
C.S. Herediano managers
L.D. Alajuelense managers